100 Years, 100 Stinkers: The Worst Films of the 20th Century is a list of the 100 worst movies (in actuality 102, which lumped franchises into slots for a grand total of 133) of the 20th century, as determined by the Stinkers Bad Movie Awards.

Background
Announced in 1998, it was conceived as a parody of AFI's 100 Years...100 Movies list of the best movies of the century. To determine the list, anyone who visited the Stinkers' website could suggest a worthy candidate; eventually, the 300 most popular choices were placed on a list for visitors to vote on followed by a ten week period where votes for a ranked list of the 20 worst films were cast.

Conclusion

The final results were revealed in 2001 as each entry was also given a descriptive paragraph in alphabetical order. Battlefield Earth topped the list of "dishonored" films beating out cult classics Plan 9 from Outer Space, Showgirls, Waterworld and Howard the Duck.

See also
The Official Razzie Movie Guide
The Golden Turkey Awards
My Year of Flops

References 

Stinkers Bad Movie Awards
Film and video fandom
2001 in film
Lists of worsts